The 2023 IIHF World Championship Division IV will be an international ice hockey tournament run by the International Ice Hockey Federation. 

The tournament will be held in Ulaanbaatar, Mongolia from 23 to 26 March 2023 after the original hosts, Kuwait, withdrew from hosting the tournament.

Four nations will participate in the tournament, including Mongolia, who will return to the World Championships after a ten-year absence. Indonesia and the Philippines will make their debut in the World Championships. Originally, the Philippines had made its debut, but withdrew before last year's tournament began due to players, coaches and staffs being affected by the COVID-19 pandemic.

Venues

Participants

Standings

Results
All times are local (UTC+8)

References

External links
Official website

IIHF World Championship Division IV
2023 IIHF Men's World Ice Hockey Championships
2023 in Mongolian sport
International ice hockey competitions hosted by Mongolia
March 2023 sports events in Asia
Sport in Ulaanbaatar
IIHF